WPZR is a Christian Adult Contemporary formatted broadcast radio station licensed to Emporia, Virginia, serving Emporia, Lawrenceville, and South Hill in Virginia and Roanoke Rapids in North Carolina. WPZR simulcasts its sister station WPER, Fredericksburg, VA. WPZR is owned and operated by Baker Family Stations.

References

External links
 WPER Online
 

1999 establishments in Virginia
Contemporary Christian radio stations in the United States
Radio stations established in 1999
Greensville County, Virginia
Emporia, Virginia
PZR